Geodermatophilus dictyosporus is a Gram-positive and gamma-ray resistant bacterium from the genus Geodermatophilus which has been isolated from soil from the Westgard Pass in the United States.

References

Bacteria described in 2015
Actinomycetia